Kaiyang railway station is a railway station in Kaiyang County, Guiyang, Guizhou, China. It opened on 1 May 2015 and is the northern terminus of the Guiyang–Kaiyang intercity railway.

References 

Railway stations in Guizhou
Railway stations in China opened in 2015